The canton of Orange-Est is a French former administrative division in the department of Vaucluse and region Provence-Alpes-Côte d'Azur. It had 29,889 inhabitants (2012). It was disbanded following the French canton reorganisation which came into effect in March 2015.

Composition
The communes in the canton of Orange-Est:
Camaret-sur-Aigues 
Jonquières
Orange (partly)
Sérignan-du-Comtat
Travaillan
Uchaux
Violès

References

Orange-Est
2015 disestablishments in France
States and territories disestablished in 2015